Castle Carlton is a hamlet in the civil parish of Reston (where population details are included)  in the East Lindsey district of Lincolnshire, England.

At Castle Carlton there is a wide moat surrounding a mound on which stood a twelfth-century motte and bailey castle, most likely wooden, founded by Justiciar Hugh Bardolph,  who is said to have slain a monster.

The village had established itself as a commercial centre by the thirteenth century, reputedly after Hugh Bardolph developed it as a "new town", and it was sometimes known as Market Carlton. Today it is considered a deserted medieval village, or DMV.

The church was dedicated to the Holy Cross, and was a small Perpendicular building. It was demolished in 1902.

References

External links
"Castle Carlton", Castlefacts.info. Retrieved 9 April 2013
"Castle Carlton", Genuki.org.uk. Retrieved 9 April 2013
Historical records

Villages in Lincolnshire
East Lindsey District